William Robertson (January 2, 1897 – April 15, 1948) was an Ontario labourer and political figure. He represented Wentworth in the Legislative Assembly of Ontario from 1943 to 1948 as a Co-operative Commonwealth member.

He was born in Bothwellhaugh, Scotland, the son of William Robertson, was educated there and came to Canada in 1926. He died when he was hit by a car right across the street from the Ontario legislative assembly in Toronto and buried in Hamilton Ontario.

References 
 Canadian Parliamentary Guide, 1947, GP Normandin

External links 

1897 births
1948 deaths
Ontario Co-operative Commonwealth Federation MPPs
20th-century Canadian politicians
Scottish emigrants to Canada
Road incident deaths in Canada
Pedestrian road incident deaths